The Locharbriggs Sandstone Formation is a formation of Cisuralian age (Early Permian). It consists of a 1000 m thick sequence of very well-sorted aeolian sandstones, with well developed dune cross-bedding. The sandstone was used as a building stone in Dumfries, Edinburgh, Glasgow and New York (including the steps of the Statue of Liberty).

References

Permian Scotland